Art and Aesthetics: a Promenade ab Homine is a book written by Benedict Beckeld along with a CD by mezzo-soprano Anna Cley  and pianist Virginie Martineau-Larderet. The book / CD was published in January 2016 by the French label Lux Classic.

"Art and Aesthetics" deals with several issues of modern art and of artistic existence, especially: 

 the use of the old to create the new; 
 why the peak of Western music has come and gone; 
 why architecture is the only art form that will always be well and dynamic; 
 the lack of coherent artistic movements through social fragmentation; 
 the academic-scientific approach to literature and how science cannot understand the artistic in any meaningful way; 
 the meaning of "ab homine", as opposed to "ad hominem"; 
 the triumph of "interactive-analytical" over "authoritarian-memorative" education, while a balance between the two is claimed to be preferable; and
 the history of perspectivism and its triumph over any objective truth. 

These ideas are discussed in a partially autobiographical way, and raised through aesthetic experiences and encounters with people and places in several countries. "The lyrical music on the CD extends his voyage from the philosophically aesthetic into the pure aesthetic."

Track listings
 CD

References

2016 books